Liposcelis entomophila is a species of booklouse in the family Liposcelididae. It is found in Africa, Australia, the Caribbean Sea, Europe and Northern Asia (excluding China), Central America, North America, South America, and Southern Asia.

References

Liposcelis
Articles created by Qbugbot
Insects described in 1892